The 2011 Intercontinental Rally Challenge was the sixth season of the Intercontinental Rally Challenge. The season consisted of twelve rounds and started on 19 January with the Monte Carlo Rally. The season ended on 5 November, at the Cyprus Rally.

The series introduced a new points system for the 2011 season, applying the FIA points system – 25–18–15–12–10–8–6–4–2–1 – which had been introduced to other championships within the last twelve months. Within the new system, the final two events in Scotland and Cyprus offered more points via a scoring coefficient. Scotland offered crews points on a 1.5 coefficient, meaning that the winner earned 37.5 points, second place 27 points, third place 22.5 points and so on. In Cyprus, double points were offered, meaning the winner received 50 points, second place 36, third place 30 and so forth. The rule was intended to increase the number of entries for the final two rounds, although Bouffier (who was still in mathematical contention for the title) did not participate in Cyprus.

Argentina was cancelled, meaning the calendar had a large proportion of tarmac events. Extra points for the final two gravel rallies meant that tarmac specialists would not necessarily dominate, however. The Proton Satria Neos were not as competitive as the Škoda Fabias or Peugeot 207s. The Monte Carlo Rally had several notable appearances, including François Delecour and 2003 World Rally Champion Petter Solberg. The final two rallies were won by Andreas Mikkelsen, who also took two other podiums and the most stage wins during the season en-route to the championship.

Calendar
The calendar had consisted of twelve events run on two continents. The schedule will include two new countries, France (Tour de Corse, former WRC event) and Hungary (Asphalt/Gravel Mecsek Rallye), plus a return to Argentina for the new gravel-based Rally de los Alerces. The final calendar was released on 10 December 2010, with the Prime Yalta Rally in Ukraine added, and the Rally Islas Canarias listed without a confirmed date. Rally Islas Canarias was reinstated to the calendar on 19 January 2011 at the expense of Rally de los Alerces, which was cancelled. Rali Vinho da Madeira was later dropped in June 2011.

Selected entries
Peugeot UK had already confirmed their entry for the 2011 season with Guy Wilks who previously raced for Škoda UK instead of 2009 champion Kris Meeke who made the switch to World Rally Championship (WRC) driving for MINI. 2003 World Rally champion Petter Solberg made a one-off appearance at the Monte Carlo Rally for Peugeot. Škoda UK, had also announced their plan to compete in IRC in 2011. The team's single car was occupied by Andreas Mikkelsen, who competed in the Skoda Italia-run car, alongside the works cars of the top two drivers in 2010, Juho Hänninen and Jan Kopecký.

Results

Standings

Drivers
 Only the best seven scores from each driver count towards the championship.

Manufacturers
 Only the best seven scores from each manufacturer count towards the championship.

2WD Cup drivers' standings
 Only the best seven scores from each driver count towards the championship.

2WD Cup manufacturers' standings
 Only the best seven scores from each manufacturer count towards the championship.

Production Cup drivers' standings
 Only the best seven scores from each driver count towards the championship.

References

External links
 The official website of the Intercontinental Rally Challenge

Intercontinental Rally Challenge seasons
Intercontinental Rally Challenge